The 2020 California State Assembly election was held on Tuesday, November 3, 2020, with the primary election being held on March 3, 2020. Voters in the 80 districts of the California State Assembly elected their representatives. The elections coincided with the elections for other offices, including for U.S. President and the state senate.

Predictions

Overview

Primary

Election

Retiring incumbents 
 13th: Susan Eggman (D–Stockton): Retiring to run for California State Senate
 25th: Kansen Chu (D–San Jose): Retiring to run for the Santa Clara County Board of Supervisors
 33rd: Jay Obernolte (R–Big Bear Lake): Retiring to run for Congress
 37th: Monique Limón (D–Santa Barbara): Retiring to run for California State Senate
 38th: Christy Smith (D–Santa Clarita): Retiring to run for Congress
 57th: Ian Calderon (D–Whittier): Retiring
 67th: Melissa Melendez (R–Lake Elsinore): Retired to run for California State Senate
 78th: Todd Gloria (D–San Diego): Retiring to run for Mayor of San Diego

Results 

Source: Official results.

District 1

District 2

District 3

District 4

District 5

District 6

District 7

District 8

District 9

District 10

District 11

District 12

District 13

District 14

District 15

District 16

District 17

District 18

District 19

District 20

District 21

District 22

District 23

District 24

District 25

District 26

District 27

District 28

District 29

District 30

District 31

District 32

District 33

District 34

District 35

District 36

District 37

District 38

District 39

District 40

District 41

District 42

District 43

District 44

District 45

District 46

District 47

District 48

District 49

District 50

District 51

District 52

District 53

District 54

District 55

District 56

District 57

District 58

District 59

District 60

District 61

District 62

District 63

District 64

District 65

District 66

District 67

District 68

District 69

District 70

District 71

District 72

District 73

District 74

District 75

District 76

District 77

District 78

District 79

District 80

References

State Assembly
California House
California State Assembly elections